The Zedriv GX5 is an electric subcompact crossover SUV made by Zedriv.

Overview

The Zedriv GX5 was first shown at the 2019 Auto Shanghai. It has 5 doors and 5 seats. It has dimensions of 4150 mm/1800 mm/1611 mm, wheelbase of 2650 mm, and a ground clearance of 150 mm. 

The GX5 costs ¥115,800 to ¥139,800.

Powertrain
The GX5 has a range of 211 miles, 121 horsepower, FWD, a 46.4 kWh battery, 140 km/h top speed, a 50km/h acceleration in 3.9 seconds. 

The GX5 has a charging time of 7.5 hours with an onboard charger, or 1 hour at a charging station.

See also
Zedriv GC1
Zedriv GC2
Zedriv GT3

References

External links
Official website

Cars introduced in 2019
Cars of China
Hatchbacks
Sport utility vehicles
Zedriv
Production electric cars